La Dinastía de Tuzantla, Michoacán, or simply La Dinastía de Tuzantla, is a Tierra Caliente band from Tuzantla, Michoacán, Mexico that was founded in 1987. It was created by the Toledo family, who are also members of the group. Their 2005 live production, En Vivo, landed the number seven spot on Billboard's Regional Mexican charts; it eventually peaked at number seven on the Hot Latin Albums chart.

The Tuzantla-raised group alongside Beto y sus Canarios are two of the leading acts of the genre.

History 
La Dinastía de Tuzantla was founded by the Toledo family, young musicians who also gave it its current appearance, including the setting, style, shape and number of current members that associated it with the place of their origin, the State of Michoacán in the Mexican tierra caliente. La Dinastia was named after the "dynasty" of the Toledo family. Their albums and songs have ranked on the Billboard Latin charts in the United States.

in 1993 they received a platinum record for the high sales of the production Y Ahora Con Banda. In addition to a silver record awarded by the Discos Ciudad record company for his career, afterwards the recognitions continued for his sales that varied between 50,000 and 70,000 copies but it was not until the album De Todo Corazón that they received a gold record for the high sales. They also received another three gold records for their productions La Maxima Emocion, Jalando A Todos y Directo A Los Exitos, In 2001, Es Grande was released, an album that contained one of the greatest hits of the Dynasty, the song Te Quiero Para Mi  which would sell more than 200,000 copies receiving the double gold.gold

The Tuzantla-raised group entered the Billboard charts in 2005. Their 2007 album, ¡Que Chulada! spent four weeks on the Top Latin Albums in early 2008 and sold 21,000 U.S. copies.

La Dinastía de Tuzantla recorded Maldito Texto which was a Award Winning Song at the 2009 BMI Latin Awards.

Early on 11 June 2020, a pillar of La Dinastía de Tuzantla died, as was Israel Aguirre López "El Raya" who served as a announcer for more than three decades and has been since the beginning of La Reyna del Sentimiento Ranchero.

Members 
The current members of the group:
 Rodolfo Toledo Arellano, Founder
 Eli Toledo Arellano, Manager
 Gustavo Toledo Arellano, Guitar
 Wilibaldo Toledo Arellano, Electric Tuba (Keyboard Bass)
 Héctor Hernández Mora, Vocalist
 Rodrigo Castelán, Vocalist
 Arturo Estévez, Vocalist
 Carlos Alberto Pineda Carreño, Vocalist
 Miguel Ángel Rodríguez Salinas, Trombone
 Moises Mariano Castañeda, Trombone
 Ricardo López Vaca, Trombone
 Jorge Hernández Bedolla, Drum
 Jorge Ruiz (Chilo), Bass Guitar
 Homero Flores, Effects (Keyboard)
 Luis Toledo, Percusion

Discography

Albums
1987: Por Tu Culpa 
1988: Tus Desprecios 
1990: Enseñame A Cantar 
1991: Ni Amores Ni Deudas 
1992: Falsa Moneda
1993: ¡Y Ahora Con Banda!
1994: ¡Más Impactante que Nunca!
1995: Le Volvimos a Dar
1996: De Todo Corazón
1997: Simplemente Tu Música: Siguen Los éxitos
1998: La Máxima Emoción
2000: Jalando a Todos
2001: Es... Grande
2002: Corridos de Siempre y para Siempre
2003: Guiados Por el Cielo
2005: El Campesino y el Sol
2006: Recuerdo de La Dinastía
2007: ¡Qué Chulada!
2009: Somos Mucha... ¡Dinastía!
2011: Te Seguire
2013: Dos Lágrimas y un Tequila
2015: Siempre Adelante
2016: Las Canciones de Mis Viejos 
2018: La Reyna de Tierra Caliente
2020: Lo Mejor del Divo de Juárez
2022: Así Es Mi Tierra

Compilations
2005: Especialmente para Tí... Románticos

Awards

References

External links
Facebook
Instagram

Musical groups from Michoacán
Tierra Caliente music groups